The 2010 season of 1. deild karla is the 56th season of second-tier football in Iceland.

Stadia and locations

League table

Results
Each team play every opponent once home and away for a total of 22 matches.

Statistics

Top goalscorers

Aleksandar Linta scored 7 of his 8 goals from the penalty spot.

References

1. deild karla (football) seasons
Iceland
Iceland
2